AbbVie Inc. is a pharmaceutical company headquartered in North Chicago, Illinois. It is ranked 6th on the list of largest biomedical companies by revenue. The company's primary product is Humira (adalimumab) ($21 billion in 2022 revenues, 37% of total), administered via injection. It is approved to treat autoimmune diseases including rheumatoid arthritis, Crohn's disease, plaque psoriasis, and ulcerative colitis. It also developed Skyrizi ($5 billion in 2022 revenues), an interleukin-23 (IL-23) inhibitor also used to treat autoimmune diseases. Its other major products include Botox ($5 billion in 2022 revenues), Imbruvica to treat cancer ($4.5 billion in 2022 revenues), Rinvoq to treat arthritis ($2.5 billion in 2022 revenues), Venclexta to treat leukemia and lymphoma ($2 billion in annual revenues), Vraylar to treat schizophrenia and bipolar disorder ($2 billion in 2022 revenues), and Mavyret to treat Hepatitis C ($1.5 billion in 2022 revenues). The company is also committed to product development for other treatments of cancer, neurologic diseases, eye care, and cystic fibrosis.

In 2023, Humira began facing competition from a biosimilar developed by Amgen. The company is also developing a drug for Parkinson's disease that could be a blockbuster drug in 2027 and is awaiting approval from the Food and Drug Administration for epcoritamab, a blood-cancer therapy under development in partnership with Genmab.

The name "AbbVie" is derived from a combination of "Abbott", the name of its former parent company, with "vie," intended as a reference to a Latin root meaning "life."

History
On October 19, 2011, Abbott Laboratories announced its plan to separate into two publicly traded companies and spin off its research-based pharmaceutical manufacturer division.  Abbvie was formed on April 10, 2012 and the separation was effective January 1, 2013, and AbbVie was officially listed on the New York Stock Exchange (ABBV) on January 2, 2013.

In March 2020, during the COVID-19 pandemic, the Israeli government announced that it would force AbbVie to license its patents for Kaletra, the brand name of lopinavir/ritonavir, a fixed dose combination medication for the treatment and prevention of HIV/AIDS which was also thought to have some applicability to fighting COVID-19. In response, AbbVie announced that it would cease enforcing its patents on the drug entirely.

Acquisitions
In January 2014, the company acquired ImmuVen. On September 3, 2014, AbbVie and Infinity Pharmaceuticals  entered into a global collaboration to develop and commercialize duvelisib, Infinity's PI3K inhibitor for the treatment of patients with cancer. On the same day, AbbVie and Calico entered into a R&D collaboration intended to discover, develop and bring to market new therapies for patients with diseases of aging including neurodegeneration and cancer. California Life Company, operating as Calico, is an Alphabet Inc. subsidiary focused on aging and age-related diseases, and led by former Genentech chairman and CEO of Arthur D. Levinson and former Genentech EVP and chief medical officer Hal V. Barron (who subsequently left the company).

In October 2014, AbbVie ended its efforts to acquire Shire, which would have been one of the largest M&A deals of that year and one of the largest tax inversions in history, due to changes in the US tax code by the US Treasury; AbbVie had to pay a $1.6 billion breakup fee.

On March 4, 2015, AbbVie announced its agreement to acquire oncology firm Pharmacyclics and its treatment for blood cancers, ibrutinib; AstraZeneca had also been bidding to acquire Pharmacyclics. Under the terms of the transaction, AbbVie agreed to pay $261.25 per share as a mix of cash and AbbVie equity. The acquisition valued at approximately $21 billion was completed on May 26, 2015. The Pharmacyclics name was retained, and it operates as a subsidiary of AbbVie from its previous Sunnyvale, California, headquarters. On June 3, 2015, AbbVie and Halozyme Therapeutics announced that they had entered into a global collaboration and licensing agreement to develop and commercialize products that combine AbbVie's treatments and Halozyme's ENHANZE drug-delivery technology, this was terminated in November 2016.

On 28 April 2016, the company announced it would acquire Stemcentrx for up to $9.8 billion. A day later, the company announced an expansion of a two and a half-year-old cystic fibrosis deal with Galapagos NV, potentially doubling milestone payments to $600 million.

On 25 June 2019, AbbVie announced it would acquire Irish-based Allergan plc for about $63 billion; however the transaction would not be structured as a tax inversion, and that post the transaction, AbbVie would remain legally domiciled in the U.S. for tax purposes. The company divested certain assets to gain FTC approval.

In July 2019, the company announced it would acquire Mavupharma, boosting its cancer drug pipeline.

In May 2021, Allergan Aesthetics announced the acquisition of Soliton. In June, Abbvie acquired TeneoOne and its lead compound TNB-383B. The compound is a BCMA-targeting immunotherapeutic for relapsed or refractory multiple myeloma.

In March 2022, Abbvie acquired Syndesi Therapeutics for up to $1 billion and its portfolio of novel modulators of the synaptic vesicle protein 2A and lead compound SDI-118. In October, the company acquired DJS Antibodies for $225 million, giving it access to an experimental drug for an aggressive lung disease as well as technology to develop certain antibody medicines.

Acquisition history

Abbvie (Spin off from Abbott Laboratories)
 Pharmacyclics (Acq 2015)
 Stemcentrx (Acq 2016)
Venice Subsidiary LLC
 Allergan, plc (Acq 2019)
Allergan, inc
MAP Pharmaceuticals Inc (Acq 2013)
Kythera Biopharmaceuticals (Acq 2015)
Actavis plc
Eden Biodesign
Watson Pharmaceuticals
Warner Chilcott Plc (Acq 2000)
Andrx Corporation (Acq 2006)
Procter & Gamble (Prescription drug div, Acq 2009)
Arrow Group (Acq 2009)
Specifar Pharmaceuticals S.A. (Acq 2011)
Ascent Pharmahealth Ltd (Acq 2012)
Actavis Group (Acq 2012)
Galen (Acq 2013)
Uteron Pharma, S.A. (Acq 2013)
Durata Therapeutics (Acq 2014)
Silom Medical Company (Acq 2014)
Forest Laboratories (Acq 2014)
Aptalis Pharma
Axcan Pharma
Eurand Pharmaceuticals
Furiex Pharmaceuticals Inc (Acq 2014)
Auden Mckenzie Holdings Limited (Acq 2015)
Oculeve, Inc (Acq 2015)
Naurex Inc (Acq 2015)
AqueSys (Acq 2015)
Northwood Medical Innovation Ltd (Acq 2015)
Topokine Therapeutics (Acq 2016)
Vitae Pharmaceuticals, Inc (Acq 2016)
Tobira Therapeutics (Acq 2016)
ForSight VISION5 (Acq 2016)
RetroSense Therapeutics (Acq 2016)
Akarna Therapeutics (Acq 2016)
Motus Therapeutics (Acq 2016)
Chase Pharmaceuticals (Acq 2016)
LifeCell (Acq 2016)
Zeltiq Aesthetics Inc. (Acq 2017)
Keller Medical, Inc (Acq 2017)
Repros Therapeutics (Acq 2017)
Envy Medical, Inc. (Acq 2019)
Mavupharma (Acq 2019)
Soliton (Acq 2021)
TeneoOne (Acq 2021)
Syndesi Therapeutics (Acq 2022)
DJS Antibodies (Acq 2022)

Collaboration
On February 10, 2016, AbbVie and Cambridge, Massachusetts-based Synlogic announced a multi-year R&D collaboration. Synlogic is a synthetic biology company built on research from the labs of James Collins and Tim Lu at MIT. As part of the collaboration, AbbVie is getting worldwide rights to Synlogic's probiotic-based technology for treating inflammatory bowel disease, and the research teams will focus on Crohn's disease and ulcerative colitis. In April 2016, the company partnered with the University of Chicago to investigate a number of areas of oncology: breast, lung, prostate, colorectal and hematological cancers. In the same month the company announced it would co-commercialize Argenx's preclinical immunotherapy, ARGX-115. ARGX-115 is a first-in-class immunotherapy targeting GARP (glycoprotein A repetitions predominant), a membrane protein believed to enhance the immunosuppressive effects of T cells. The company also announced a deal to co-develop/commercialize at least one of CytomX Probody's conjugates against CD71 (transferrin receptor 1).

In March 2020, AbbVie announced plans to evaluate the Kaletra/Aluvia HIV medicine as possible COVID-19 treatment. The company entered into various partnerships with health authorities in different countries to investigate the efficacy of the medication. However, the first non-blinded, randomized trial found the drug not useful to treat severe COVID-19.

Controversies

Drug pricing
First released in 2003, AbbVie has since raised the price of Humira by more than 470%, culminating in an annual supply costing about $77,000. It has increased the price of Imbruvica, a drug used to treat mantle cell lymphoma and other cancers, by 82% since it launched in 2013. In 2022, it’s priced at $181,529. For patients taking four pills each day, it costs $242,039.

According to the Wall Street Journal as of January 2016 ibrutinib, a specialty drug, cost US$116,600 to $155,400 a year wholesale in the United States. In spite of discounts and medical insurance, the prohibitive price causes some patients to not fill their prescriptions. AbbVie estimates global sales of the drug at $1 billion in 2016 and $5 billion in 2020.

Anti-competitive practices 
AbbVie has  been accused of using anti-competitive patent thickets to prevent potentially cheaper biosimilars from entering the market. It is currently caught up in a legislative battle against Icelandic Alvotech, which is trying to bring a Humira biosimilar to market. Forest Laboratories, a subsidiary of AbbVie, has been accused of using unlawful deals to prevent generic versions of its Alzheimer’s disease drug,   Namenda, from entering the market.

In 2018, AbbVie agreed to pay $25 million to resolve allegations that it made use of kickback schemes to promote its cholesterol drug Tricor. In 2020, AbbVie agreed to pay $24M to resolve allegations that it made use of kickback schemes to promote its rheumatoid arthritis drug Humira using "nurse ambassadors".

Tax avoidance
In June 2021, the United States Senate Finance Committee, under Chair Ron Wyden (D-OR), began an investigation to determine if the company used the Tax Cuts and Jobs Act of 2017 to buy back its own stock using income saved by the tax law. In a letter to AbbVie CEO Richard Gonzalez, Wyden noted the company suffered a 2020 pretax loss in the US of $4.5 billion and an overseas pretax profit of $7.9 billion the same year. Wyden accused the company of shifting revenue to avoid US taxes.

Marketing of Opioid painkillers 
In July 2022 the company agreed to pay up to $2.37 billion to settle U.S. lawsuits against its Allergan unit over the marketing of opioid painkillers.  As part of the settlement, AbbVie, denied any wrongdoing.  The company's stock fell 6 percent following an earnings report that included a $2.2 billion charge related to the opioid deal.

Litigation by the company against the NHS
In 2018, it started litigation against NHS England in the Technology and Construction Court claiming that the agency breached procurement rules and had not treated the company fairly during what was described as "the single largest medicines procurement ever done by the NHS" when seeking suppliers for hepatitis C treatments. In 2019, a UK court dismissed AbbVie's case against the NHS.

Carbon footprint
AbbVie reported Total CO2e emissions (Direct + Indirect) for the twelve months ending 31 December 2020 at 508 Kt (-57 /-10.1% y-o-y). and plans to reduce  emissions 25% by 2025 from a 2015 base year.

References

External links

 
2013 establishments in Illinois
2013 initial public offerings
Abbott Laboratories
American companies established in 2013
Biotechnology companies established in 2013
Biotechnology companies of the United States
Biopharmaceutical companies
Companies based in Lake County, Illinois
Companies listed on the New York Stock Exchange
Corporate spin-offs
Health care companies based in Illinois
Orphan drug companies
Pharmaceutical companies established in 2013
Pharmaceutical companies of the United States